Megachile rufipes is a species of bee in the family Megachilidae. It was described by Johan Christian Fabricius in 1781.

References

Rufipes
Insects described in 1781